Jefferson Rodrigues de Brito (born 16 October 1981), commonly known as Ciço, is a Brazilian futsal player who plays for Intelli/Orlândia as a Defender.

Honours

1 World Cup (2008)
1 División de Honor (08/09)
1 Liga Futsal (02/03)
2 Copas de España (2006, 2008)
1 Supercopa de España (2010)
1 Grand Prix (2009)
1 Supercopa de Portugal (2003)
1 Intercontinental (2000)
1 Nations Cup (01)
2 Latin Cup (02 y 03)
1 Juego Sudamericano (02)
2 C. Estatales (00/01, 01/02)
1 C. Metropolitano (01/02)
1 C. São Paulo (01/02)
1 C. Topper (01/02)
1 Catarinense (98/99)
2 Juegos Abiertos (99, 00)
1 Copa Xunta de Galicia (2005)

References

External links
lnfs.es

1981 births
Living people
Brazilian men's futsal players
ElPozo Murcia FS players
Inter FS players
Santiago Futsal players
FS Cartagena players
Foolad Mahan FSC players
ADC Intelli players
Sportspeople from Florianópolis
Futsal defenders
Pan American Games gold medalists for Brazil
Futsal players at the 2007 Pan American Games
Medalists at the 2007 Pan American Games
Pan American Games medalists in futsal